Fujian cuisine or Fujianese cuisine, also known as Min cuisine, is one of the native Chinese cuisines derived from the cooking style of China's Fujian Province, most notably from the provincial capital, Fuzhou. "Fujian cuisine" in this article refers to the cuisines of Min Chinese speaking people within Fujian. Other cuisines in Fujian include Hakka cuisine, and the ethnic minority cuisines of the She and Tanka people. Fujian cuisine is known to be light but flavourful, soft, and tender, with particular emphasis on umami taste, known in Chinese cooking as xianwei, as well as retaining the original flavour of the main ingredients instead of masking them. 

Many diverse seafood and woodland delicacies are used, including a myriad variety of local fish, shellfish and turtles, or indigenous edible mushrooms and bamboo shoots, provided by the coastal and mountainous regions of Fujian. The most commonly employed cooking techniques in the region's cuisine include braising, stewing, steaming and boiling.

As the people of Fujian often travel to and from the sea, their food customs have gradually formed a unique cuisine with creative characteristics. Fujian cuisine is famous for preparing mountain and seafood based on good color, aroma, and shape, especially "fragrance" and "taste." Its fresh, mellow, meaty, non-greasy style characteristics and the features of a wide range of soups take a unique place in the field of Chinese cuisine.

Particular attention is paid on the finesse of knife skills and cooking technique of the chefs, which is used to enhance the flavour, aroma and texture of seafood and other foods. Strong emphasis is put on the making and utilising of broth and soups. There are sayings in the region's cuisine: "One broth can be changed into numerous (ten) forms" and "It is unacceptable for a meal to not have soup".

Fermented fish sauce, known locally as "shrimp oil", is also commonly used in the cuisine, along with oyster, crab and shrimp. Peanuts (utilised for both savoury dishes and desserts) are also prevalent, and can be boiled, fried, roasted, crushed, ground or even turned into a paste. Peanuts can be used as a garnish, feature in soups and even be added to braised or stir-fried dishes.

Fujian cuisine has had a profound impact on Taiwanese cuisine and on the overseas Chinese cuisines found in Southeast Asia (particularly the Malay Archipelago) as the majority of Taiwanese and Southeast Asian Chinese people have ancestral roots in Fujian province.

Styles
Fujian cuisine consists of several styles:
 Fuzhou: The taste is lighter compared to other styles, often with an equally-mixed taste of sweet and sour. Fuzhou is famous for its soups, and its use of fermented fish sauce and red yeast rice.
 Putian/Henghwa: From the coastal town of Putian, best known for seafood dishes including lor mee and Doutuo clams.
 Southern Fujian: The taste is stronger than other Fujianese cuisines, showing obvious influence from Southeast Asian dishes. Use of sugar and spices (like shacha sauce and five-spice powder) is more common. Various kinds of slow-cooked soup (not quite similar to the Cantonese tradition) are found. Many dishes come with dipping sauces.
 Western Fujian: There are often slight spicy tastes from mustard and pepper and the cooking methods are often steaming, frying and stir-frying. The food is saltier and oilier compared to other parts of Fujian, usually focusing on meat rather than seafood.

Seasonings

Unique seasonings from Fujian include fish sauce, shrimp paste, sugar, shacha sauce and preserved apricot. Wine lees from the production of rice wine is also commonly used in all aspects of the region's cuisine. Red yeast rice is also commonly used in Fujian cuisine, imparting a rosy-red hue to the foods, pleasant aroma, and slightly sweet taste.

Fujian is also well known for its "drunken" (wine marinated) dishes and is famous for the quality of the soup stocks and bases used to flavour their dishes, soups and stews.

Notable dishes
One of the most famous dishes in Fujian cuisine is "Buddha Jumps Over the Wall", a complex dish making use of many ingredients, including shark's fin, sea cucumber, abalone and Shaoxing wine.

Fujian is also notable for yanpi, literally "swallow skin," a thin wrapper made with large proportions of lean minced pork. This wrapper has a unique texture due to the incorporation of meat and has a "bite" similar to things made with surimi. Yanpi is used to make rouyan, a type of wonton.

There are many eating places around the province that sell these specialties for two yuan, and which are thus known as "two-yuan eateries". In Xiamen, a local specialty is worm jelly, an aspic made from a species of marine peanut worm.

See also

 Shaxian delicacies
 List of Chinese dishes
 Chinatown, Flushing
 Brooklyn's Fuzhou Town (福州埠)
 Manhattan's Little Fuzhou (小福州)

References

 
Regional cuisines of China